Hungary–North Korea relations are foreign relations between Hungary and Democratic People's Republic of Korea (DPRK), commonly known as North Korea. Relations between the two countries existed since the Korean War, but however have evolved into conflicts.

History 
The Second Hungarian Republic recognized the Democratic People's Republic of Korea on November 11, 1948, as the sole legal sovereign entity of the entire Korea.

Following the Korean War, the DPRK sent a number of its veterans to Hungary as exchange students. When the Hungarian Revolution of 1956 began, roughly 200 of these students joined in; their war experience proved to be of aid to the Hungarian students, many of whom lacked military training and could not operate the weapons and equipment they captured. In the aftermath of the revolution, Soviet forces and Hungarian police gathered up the North Korean students—easily distinguished from locals by their appearance—and deported them back to the DPRK, with a few escaping to Austria.

In 1988, Kim Jong-il's brother Kim Pyong-il was assigned to Hungary as the DPRK's ambassador. However, little more than a year later, Hungary would become the first Eastern Bloc nation to open relations with South Korea; in response, the DPRK withdrew Kim from Hungary and sent him to Bulgaria instead. They angrily referred to the Hungarian decision as a "betrayal", and then expelled the Hungarian envoy to Pyongyang, Miklós Lengyel. This led to a downturn in bilateral ties which lasted over a decade-and-a-half; in a 2004 interview with The Korea Herald, then-deputy State Secretary Gábor Szentiványi indicated that his government were interested in improving their relations with the North. However, as of 2009, the former Hungarian embassy building in Pyongyang remained empty; Budapest's relations with Pyongyang are handled through their embassy in Beijing, though according to Lengyel, who since became Hungary's ambassador to South Korea, there were plans of transferring the responsibility for that relationship to him.

In 2002, it emerged that a former North Korean diplomat in Budapest had been involved in international arms trafficking while in Hungary.

See also
Foreign relations of Hungary
Foreign relations of North Korea

References

External links
Hungarian ministry of foreign affairs 

 
North Korea
Bilateral relations of North Korea